Ariño is a municipality located in the province of Teruel, Aragon, Spain. According to the 2004 census (INE), the municipality has a population of 898 inhabitants. A former leader of the ELN- José Antonio Jiménez Comín was born in this municipality and died in 1970 in Colombia.

References 

Municipalities in the Province of Teruel